{{DISPLAYTITLE:C11H20O10}}
The molecular formula C11H20O10 (molar mass: 312.27 g/mol, molar mass: 312.1056 u) may refer to:

 Sambubiose, a disaccharide
 Vicianose, a disaccharide